Mosè Bianchi (1840–1904) was an Italian painter and printmaker.

Biography
Bianchi was born in Monza. His family moved to Milan and he enrolled at the Brera Academy. Having interrupted his studies to serve in the second war of independence, he returned to attend the school of painting directed by Giuseppe Bertini.

The award of a grant in 1867 enabled him to visit Venice and then Paris in 1869. He took part with some success at the Brera exhibitions and the Vienna Exhibition of 1873. It was in this period that he began to paint genre scenes in 18th-century settings and numerous portraits, soon becoming one of the artists most in demand with the Milanese middle classes. He returned to Venice in 1879 and visited Chioggia for the first time. Both places were to be featured also in later years in a series of intense views exhibited at exhibitions in Milan and Venice alongside genre scenes, views of Milan and landscapes of the countryside around Gignese.

Among his main works were a Monaca di Monza and a Milton exhibited in 1877 in Naples. In 1878, he exhibited in Paris a portrait of his father, a portrait of Signora Ponti, and I Chierici in Processione (Clerics in Procession). In 1881 in Milan, he exhibited: Burrasca nel Golfo di Venice; in 1884 in Turin, he exhibited : Canale di Chioggia; in 1887 Venice, he exhibited five canvases: Mascherata Chioggiotta; Laguna in burrasca; Chioggia ; Parola di Dio, and Vaporino di Chioggia.

Art

Works
Gondola sul canale, oil on canvas, Accademia Carrara, Bergamo.
A victim of the 17th-century (1863) Museo Civico, Brescia,
Deposition, 1887 Cappella Visconti, Cimitère, Carnisio,
Woman painter (1874); Carrobbio, Museo Raccolte Frugone at Villa Grimaldi-Fassio in Nervi, a frazione of Genoa,
Frescoes, 1887 Villa San Fermo (or Giovanelli), Lonigo
The sagra della vigilia, 1864; The Female letter-reader 1867; I fratelli al campo, 1867; The benedizione delle box, 1870 Interno rustico, Pinacoteca di Brera, Milan,
Frescoes in Salotto Azzurro; Flora (1885), Palazzo Turati, Milan,
Deposition, 1899, Cimitero Monumentale, Cappella Frova, Milan
Frescos, Saletta Reale, Stazione Centrale, Milan
Cleopatra, 1865; Portrait of Orsola Rebecchi(1875); Portrait of Luigi Galbiati (1876); Traversata, (1885); Snows in Milan (c. 1885); Il ritorno dalla sagra (1887); Fishermen of Chioggia (1890); The Washerwomen (1894); Sad Return (1897); Notturno, (c. 1898); Reminiscenze milanesi del 1848 1898 Busto di giovane donna, 1898 - 1899, Galleria d'Arte Moderna, Milan
Portrait of Giulia Lucini Colombani (1894), Ospedale Maggiore, Milan
Crucifixion, 1881 Diocesan Museum, Milan,
Cavalcando; Pecore al ruscello; Scena rustic; Flora; Monache al lido; Donna col bambino al seno; Paolo and Francesca Pinacoteca Ambrosiana, Milan
Lady of Monza (1865); Portrait of a Man (1875); The sorelle 1887, Museo Civico, Monza
A street of Verona, Capodimonte Museum, Naples
Resurrection (1874); Studio di testa, 1880; The paurose, 1881; Word of God 1887; Vaporino of Chioggia; Bosco nel Parco di Monza, 1895 Galleria Nazionale d'Arte Moderna, Rome,
The Communion of St Louis Gonzaga (1864) Church Santa Maria Nascente and S. Carlo, Sant'Albino,
It pittore Londonio, 1866; The lover Egidio, 1867; La Monaca di Monza, 1867 Galleria d'arte moderna, Turin
The bufera, tempera on cardboard, Museo Revoltella, Trieste
Crucifixion (1879), parish church S. Antonio Abate, Valmadrera,
Portait of a Lady c. 1898, Museo di Castelvecchio, Verona,
Sanctuary of the Blessed Virgin of the Miracles, Corbetta
Portrait of Simonetta Galimberti (1861)
Portrait of Giacinta Galimberti (1861)
After the Duel (1866)
In Monza Cathedral (1872)
Portrait of a Man (1875)
Portrait of Giuseppe Antonio Fossati (1875)
La storia (1877)
Stemma sabaudo it Genio di Savoia (1883-1884)
The spesa del Curato, (1885)

See also 
 Emilio Borsa
 Pompeo Mariani

References
 Laura Casone, Mosè Bianchi, online catalogue Artgate by Fondazione Cariplo, 2010, CC BY-SA (source for the first revision of this article).

Other projects

19th-century Italian painters
Italian male painters
Jewish painters
19th-century Italian Jews
People from Monza
Brera Academy alumni
Academic staff of Brera Academy
1840 births
1904 deaths
Painters from Milan
Italian printmakers
19th-century printmakers
19th-century Italian male artists